The BeNe Super Cup was a women's football competition between the holders of the Dutch Vrouwen Eredivisie and the Belgian Women's First Division. It was played two times.

Its inaugural edition took place on 30 August 2011 in Venlo, Netherlands and confronted Standard Liège and FC Twente. Standard won 4-1. 

The competition was a first step towards the joint BeNe League that gathered the top eight teams from each country and was started in the 2012–13 season. It has not been held since.

Finals played

References

Women's football competitions in the Netherlands
Women's football competitions in Belgium
Cup
Defunct football competitions in the Netherlands
2011–12 in Belgian football
2012–13 in Belgian football
Super
Super